Wang Boming, is the Chairman of Caijing’s parent company, the SEEC Media Group. He is also the editor-in-chief of Caijing magazine.

Wang was among the first wave of students to study overseas in the early 1980s. He earned a MPA from School of International and Public Affairs, Columbia University in 1987/88. To earn extra money during his studies, he wrote for a Chinese language newspaper in New York, and later worked as an economist for the New York Stock Exchange in the late 1980s, before returning to China to join other foreign-educated students at the Stock Exchange Executive Council, a loosely government-affiliated think tank charged with helping to establish China's stock markets in the early 1990s. After helping to found the exchanges in Shanghai and Shenzhen, the SEEC ventured into media by publishing Securities Market Weekly, China's first publication on the securities industry, which boasted a circulation of nearly a million at its peak in the late 1990s.

References

External links 

 

Living people
Year of birth missing (living people)
Chinese editors
Chinese magazine editors
School of International and Public Affairs, Columbia University alumni
Chinese financial businesspeople